Leuserattus is a genus of spiders in the family Salticidae. It was first described in 2012 by Prószyński & Deeleman-Reinhold. , it contains only one species, Leuserattus gunung, found in Sumatra.

References

Salticidae
Monotypic Salticidae genera
Spiders of Asia